Pinker may refer to:

People
George Pinker (1924–2007), British obstetrician and gynecologist
Rachel Pinker, American meteorologist
Robert Pinker (born 1931), British sociologist
Steven Pinker (born 1954), Canadian-American psychologist, linguist and popular science author
Susan Pinker (born 1957), Canadian developmental psychologist

Bands
Horace Pinker, American punk rock band
The Pinker Tones, alternative pop band from Barcelona, Spain